Black December refers to at least nine shark attacks on humans causing six deaths that occurred along the coast of Natal Province in the Union of South Africa, from December 18, 1957 to April 5, 1958.

Perfect storm
In December 1957 several key factors occurred simultaneously to attract sharks to the Durban area, including: (1) whaling ships operating in the area; (2) rivers had flooded and washed livestock into the Indian Ocean and made the river deltas murky; and (3) recent resort development had increased the number of tourists swimming off the beaches.
Adding to the confusion was the lack of adequate shark research and the knowledge to prevent shark attacks in 1957.

Attack victims

Attempted solutions
Tourists fled the Durban area during Black December causing a devastating impact on the local economy. The local authorities desperately made attempts to protect swimmers and surfers from sharks. These attempts included enclosures built from wooden poles and netting; however, both were ineffective and were destroyed by the surf. A South African Navy frigate dropped depth charges causing few shark fatalities and attracted many more sharks into the area that feasted on the dead fish.

KwaZulu-Natal Sharks Board

As a result of Black December the KwaZulu-Natal Sharks Board, previously the Natal Sharks Board and  Natal Anti-Shark Measures Board, was formed in 1962. The organization's mandate is to maintain shark nets and drum lines at 38 places, along 320 km of coastline of the KwaZulu-Natal Province, South Africa, to protect bathers and surfers from possible shark attacks.

See also

 List of fatal shark attacks in South African territorial waters
 List of shark attacks in South African territorial waters
 2010 Sharm El Sheikh shark attacks
 Jersey Shore shark attacks of 1916
 Red Triangle (Pacific Ocean)
 Summer of the Shark

References

1957 in South Africa
1958 in South Africa
Deaths due to shark attacks
Disasters in South Africa
Shark attacks
1957 disasters in South Africa
1958 disasters in South Africa